Marie-Pierre Vedrenne is a French lawyer and politician who was elected as a Member of the European Parliament in 2019.

Political career
In parliament, Vedrenne has been a vice-chair of the Committee on International Trade and a member of the Committee on Petitions since 2019.

In addition to her committee assignments, Vedrenne is part of the European Parliament Intergroup on Children’s Rights, the European Parliament Intergroup on Climate Change, Biodiversity and Sustainable Development, the European Parliament Intergroup on Seas, Rivers, Islands and Coastal Areas, the MEPs Against Cancer group and the Spinelli Group.

In October 2021, Vedrenne and Valérie Hayer were appointed as co-chairs of President Emmanuel Macron's "Renaissance" electoral list in the European Parliament, replacing Stéphane Séjourné.

References

1982 births
Living people
MEPs for France 2019–2024
21st-century women MEPs for France
Democratic Movement (France) MEPs
European Democratic Party MEPs